Xeropotamou monastery is an Eastern Orthodox monastery at the monastic state of Mount Athos in Greece, in the middle side of peninsula. The monastery ranks eighth in the hierarchy of the Athonite monasteries. It was founded in the 10th century, and is dedicated to the Forty Martyrs of Sebaste.

Xeropotamou houses numerous relics, the most prominent being the largest extant piece of the True Cross.  For this reason, the monastery also celebrates a patronal feastday on September 14, the feast of the Elevation of the Holy Cross.

The library contains 409 manuscripts, and about 600 printed books. Today the monastery has about 25 monks.

 connects Xeropotamou Monastery with St. Panteleimon Monastery.

References

External links

 Xeropotamou monastery at the Mount Athos website 
 Greek Ministry of Culture: Holy Monastery of Xeropotamou

 
Christian monasteries established in the 10th century
Monasteries on Mount Athos
Greek Orthodox monasteries